David Clark (born July 3, 1953) is an American politician and banker from Utah. A Republican, he was a member of the Utah State House, representing the state's 74th house district in Santa Clara. He was elected by his colleagues in November 2006 to serve as Majority Leader in the Utah House.  In November 2008 he was elected Speaker of the House and served two terms in that capacity.

Early life, education, and banking career
David Clark was born in Provo, Utah.  He graduated from Brigham Young University, where he played football for coach LaVell Edwards. He also attended National Commercial Lenders Graduate School and Pacific Coast School of Banking. In 1976, he became President of Regional Banking of Zions Bank.

Utah House of Representatives

Elections
In 2000, Clark decided to run for the Utah House of Representatives. He defeated incumbent Republican State Representative Dennis Iverson in the primary 51%-49%. He won the general election unopposed. He won re-election 2002 (74%), 2004 (92%), 2006 (72%), 2008 (72%), and 2010 (78%).

Tenure
Legislative accomplishments

Clark is best known for his work on health care issues, helping to create Utah’s Health Insurance Exchange (signed into law by Governor Utah’s Health Insurance Exchange and chairing the Health Reform Task Force while serving as speaker.

Party Leadership
Clark became Majority Leader in 2007 and Speaker of the House in 2009. However, in December 2010 State Representative Becky Lockhart (R-Provo) defeated Clark by only one vote (30-28).

Committee assignments
Health and Human Services Interim Committee 
House Health and Human Services Committee 
House Revenue and Taxation Committee 
House Rules Committee 
Revenue and Taxation Interim Committee 
Social Services Appropriations Subcommittee (Chairman)

2012 congressional election
In November 2011, he decided to resign his seat to run for the congress in Utah's 2nd congressional district. The seat is being vacated by incumbent Democrat Jim Matheson, who is running in Utah's newly-drawn 4th congressional district. He officially launched his bid on January 13, 2012.

Personal life
Clark and his wife Nan have four children and live in Santa Clara. He is a member of the Church of Jesus Christ of Latter-day Saints.

References

1953 births
BYU Cougars football players
Living people
Politicians from Provo, Utah
People from Santa Clara, Utah
Speakers of the Utah House of Representatives
Republican Party members of the Utah House of Representatives
21st-century American politicians